Trachyandra erythrorrhiza is a species of plant which is endemic to the province of Gauteng in South Africa.  Its natural habitat is intermittent freshwater marshes. It is threatened by habitat loss.

References

erythrorrhiza
Flora of the Northern Provinces
Endemic flora of South Africa
Vulnerable plants
Taxonomy articles created by Polbot